Tasmania, an island and state of Australia, has been represented on the Australian Paralympic team since 1980.  The greatest number of Tasmanian representatives was four at the 1996 Atlanta Paralympics.    

Donald Dann OAM (12 February 1949 - 31 July 2005) was Tasmania's first Paralympian, competing in the 1980 Arnhem Paralympics in the sports of athletics and table tennis.

Athletes by Games

London 2012 Summer Paralympics

 Matthew Bugg, Sailing
 Todd Hodgetts, Athletics
 Roger Massie, Head Coach Table Tennis

Vancouver 2010 Winter Paralympics

 Dominic Monypenny

Beijing 2008 Paralympics

 Dominic Monypenny

Athens 2004 Paralympics

In 2004, there were no representatives from Tasmania competing at the Athens Paralympic Games

Sydney 2000 Paralympics

 Melissa Carlton
 Clayton Johnson
 Roger Massie - Assistance Coach Table Tennis

Atlanta 1996 Paralympics

 Melissa Carlton
 Leroi Court
 Brad Thomas - track and field
 Paul Wiggins

Barcelona 1992 Paralympics

Brad Thomas - track and field
Paul Wiggins

1988 Seoul

 Brad Thomas - track and field

1984 Stoke Mandeville / Los Angeles Summer Paralympics

 Julie Dowling
 Donald Dann

1980 Arnhem Paralympics

 Donald Dann

References

Sport in Tasmania
Tasmania